California's 53rd State Assembly district is one of 80 California State Assembly districts. Since 2014, it is represented by Democrat Miguel Santiago of Los Angeles.

District profile
The district encompasses the heart of Los Angeles, including most of Downtown and parts of the Eastside. The district is heavily urban and Latino.

Los Angeles County – 4.7%
 Huntington Park – 88.1%
 Los Angeles – 10.9%
 Boyle Heights – partial
 Downtown – partial
 Koreatown
 Little Tokyo
 Pico-Union
 Westlake – partial
 Vernon

Election results from statewide races

List of Assembly Members 
Due to redistricting, the 53rd district has been moved around different parts of the state. The current iteration resulted from the 2011 redistricting by the California Citizens Redistricting Commission.

Election results 1992 - present

2020

2018

2016

2014

2012

2010

2008

2006

2004

2002

2000

1998

1996

1994

1992

See also 
 California State Assembly
 California State Assembly districts
 Districts in California

References

External links 
 District map from the California Citizens Redistricting Commission

53
Government of Los Angeles
Government of Los Angeles County, California
Downtown Los Angeles
Boyle Heights, Los Angeles
Civic Center, Los Angeles
Huntington Park, California
Koreatown, Los Angeles
Little Tokyo, Los Angeles
Pico-Union, Los Angeles
Westlake, Los Angeles